Caribbean cuisine is a fusion of West African, Creole, Cajun, Amerindian, European, Latin American, Indian/South Asian, Middle Eastern, and Chinese. These traditions were brought from many different countries when they came to the Caribbean. In addition, the population has created styles that are unique to the region.

History
The Caribbean is a fusion of West African, Amerindian, East Asian, Arab, South Asian, British, Spanish, Dutch and French cuisines. In 1493, during the voyages of Christopher Columbus, the Spaniards introduced a variety of ingredients, including coconut, chickpeas, cilantro, eggplants, onions and garlic.

Caribbean dishes

Ingredients that are common in most islands' dishes are rice, plantains, beans, cassava, cilantro, bell peppers, chickpeas, tomatoes, sweet potatoes, coconut, and any of various meats that are locally available like beef, poultry, pork or fish. A characteristic seasoning for the region is a green herb-and-oil-based marinade called sofrito, which imparts a flavor profile which is quintessentially Caribbean in character. Ingredients may include garlic, onions, scotch bonnet peppers, celery, green onions, and herbs like cilantro, Mexican mint, chives, marjoram, rosemary, tarragon and thyme. This green seasoning is used for a variety of dishes like curries, stews and roasted meats.

Traditional dishes are so important to regional culture that, for example, the local version of Caribbean goat stew has been chosen as the official national dish of Montserrat and is also one of the signature dishes of St. Kitts and Nevis. Another popular dish in the Anglophone Caribbean is called "cook-up", or pelau. Ackee and saltfish is another popular dish that is unique to Jamaica. Callaloo is a dish containing leafy vegetables such as spinach and sometimes okra amongst others, widely distributed in the Caribbean, with a distinctively mixed African and indigenous character.

The variety of dessert dishes in the area also reflects the mixed origins of the recipes. In some areas, black cake, a derivative of English Christmas pudding, may be served, especially on special occasions.

Over time, food from the Caribbean has evolved into a narrative technique through which their culture has been accentuated and promoted. However, by studying Caribbean culture through a literary lens there then runs the risk of generalizing exoticist ideas about food practices from the tropics. Some food theorists argue that this depiction of Caribbean food in various forms of media contributes to the inaccurate conceptions revolving around their culinary practices, which are much more grounded in unpleasant historical events. Therefore, it can be argued that the connection between the idea of the Caribbean being the ultimate paradise and Caribbean food being exotic is based on inaccurate information.

By location

 Anguillian cuisine
 Antigua and Barbuda cuisine
 Bahamian cuisine
 Barbadian cuisine
 Cayman Islands cuisine
 Cuban cuisine
 Curaçaoan cuisine
 Dominica cuisine
 Dominican Republic cuisine
 Grenadan cuisine
 Haitian cuisine
 Jamaican cuisine
 Martinique cuisine
 Monserratian cuisine
 Puerto Rican cuisine
 Saint Barthélemy cuisine
 Saint Kitts and Nevis cuisine
 Saint Lucian cuisine
 Trinidad and Tobago cuisine
 Turks and Caicos Islands cuisine
 Virgin Islands cuisine

See also

 Ground provisions
 List of cuisines
 Caribbean Chinese cuisine
 Puerto Rican Chinese cuisine

References